Anastasios George Leventis (December 1902 – October 25, 1978) was a Greek Cypriot businessman who founded a major merchandise trading firm, A.G. Leventis (Nigeria) Plc, in West Africa. A dominant figure in the economy of many West African countries and especially Nigeria, he was awarded the title of Babalaje of Egbaland by Alake Ladapo Ademola. The Egba Scholarship Scheme popularly known as "A.G. Leventis (Egba) Scholarship Scheme" which award study funds to both undergraduate and postgraduate students of Abeokuta and Egbaland, in general, was coined after his name and it still exists till date.

His daughter Fotini married politician Tassos Papadopoulos, who eventually became President of Cyprus.

Early life
Leventis was born in the village of Lemythou, Limassol District, in the Troodos Mountains. His father was a minister of the Greek Orthodox Church and was also a schoolmaster. Leventis attended Mitsis Commercial School. At the age of 16, he traveled to France to look for employment and educational opportunities. In 1920, he took up a job opportunity in Nigeria working at a trading post in Nwaniba, Akwa Ibom State.

Career
In 1922, Leventis joined the firm of A.J. Tangalakis in Abeokuta, Ogun State. He developed most of his connections with Nigeria while working in the city. When his firm merged with G.B. Ollivant, Leventis stayed with the amalgamated entity and rose to become the general manager of G. B. Ollivant in Ghana. In 1937, he left the firm after it was acquired by United Africa Company.  Leventis then formed his own company and started out as a produce buyer, partly financed by some British cotton manufacturers. He was assisted in the new venture by his brother C.P. Leventis, who organized the Nigerian branch in 1942 and a friend, G.E. Keralakis. In Ghana, Leventis was sympathetic to the cause of African nationalists. He was a friend of Kwame Nkrumah and J.B. Danquah. When a riot flared up in the country, many foreign stores were burnt and closed but only Leventis owned stores remained untouched and were opened throughout the period of conflict. He was made a Ghanaian ambassador to France when Nkrumah was elected president of Ghana.

A.G. Leventis established a branch in Nigeria, called A.G. Leventis Nigeria Plc. Within a few years, the Nigerian company expanded its business line from cotton exports to merchandise trading and secured new sources of supplies.  In the late 1940s, motivated by diversification and modernization the firm changed its strategy. In 1960, Leventis Group speedily completed the Federal Palace Hotel at the request of the Nigerian government, the hotel served as accommodation for guests expected during Nigeria's independence celebration. By the 1960s his firm had grown to become one of the largest distributors in Nigeria and one of the largest merchandise traders in the West African region.  In Nigeria, he restructured the business from general trading into a specialized trading firm and established various department stores. During this period, he thrived as a result of the nation's relatively open economy, as it was not until the 1970s that economic nationalism became a dominant initiative.  His marketing style made the Leventis name familiar to many customers in Nigeria. Apart from his sympathy for the nationalist movement in Africa, he also gave his support to his native country's independence movement. He developed a friendship with Arch-Bishop Makarios III who appointed him Cyprus' ambassador to UNESCO and awarded him the medal of St. Barnabas.

Philanthropy
After his death in 1978, the A.G. Leventis Foundation was established in 1979. It has a primary focus on the cultural heritage of Cyprus and Greece, especially reflected in its collections of Cypriot antiquities displayed in several museums around the world, its restoration of cultural monuments, and its sponsorship of scholarships for postgraduate work in several fields including archaeology and agriculture. The foundation also sponsors work in the areas of environmental protection and medical research.

In 1987 the A.G. Leventis Gallery was opened in the British Museum, to display Cypriot antiquities from the early Bronze Age to the Roman era.  In 1997, a similar display was opened at the Fitzwilliam Museum, and in 2000 another at the Metropolitan Museum of Art, New York.

Private life
The earliest records of his family go back to the 18th Century when a young ancestor had traveled to the Peloponnese to join the abortive 1770 uprising against Ottoman rule (known to history as the ‘Orlov’ rebellion). By the time of his birth, his family counted a number of distinguished clerics who served at the highest levels — metropolitan bishops, patriarchs from the Orthodox churches of Jerusalem and Antioch, as well as from the Church of Cyprus.

Born in December 1902 in Lemythou, Cyprus to Neoklis/Papaneoklis Leventis and Salome Theocharides.He had several brothers and sisters: Costas; George, who first went to Egypt; Kalliopi who married Alkiviades David, grandmother of film producer [Alki David]mother of Claire Seraphim, Andrew David, Salome Economides, George David, Anastasia David ; Evagoras father of Michael and George Leventis; Katerina, who wed Mr. Myrianthousis; Charalambos; Anastasios; Christodoulos.

He married Fofi.He had a child, Fotini Papadopoulos Leventis.He had four grand children.

Constantinos Yiorkadjis (Mayor of Nicosia).Maria Yiorkadji, Nicolas Papadopoulos (Member of the Cypriot Parliament),Anastasia Papadopoulou.

He is also uncle to Constantine (Dino) Leventis (1938–2002), businessman and major art benefactor of Hellenic art at the Metropolitan Museum of Art in New York and other museums around the world: in April 2000, the Metropolitan Museum opened the A.G. Leventis Foundation Gallery where the museum's collection of Cypriot sculpture, terracottas, vases, jewelry and coins from the fifth and fourth centuries BC are displayed. The foundation also helped pay for similar galleries devoted to ancient Greek and Cypriot art in the British Museum, the Louvre in Paris and the Fitzwilliam Museum at Cambridge University, among others, according to its latest annual report. In Greece, it has financed extensive archeological work.

References

External links
Leventis Foundation website
Conglomerate Business A.G Leventis Nigeria Plc

1902 births
1978 deaths
20th-century Cypriot businesspeople
Cypriot expatriates in Nigeria